Euchlaena johnsonaria, or Johnson's euchlaena moth, is a moth of the family Geometridae. The species was first described by Asa Fitch in 1870. It is found in North America, where it has been recorded from southern coastal British Columbia east to Nova Scotia, south to New Jersey, Missouri and Oregon. The habitat consists of deciduous wooded areas.

The wingspan is about 32 mm. The ground colour of the forewings varies from light to dark rust brown. The antemedial and postmedial lines are thin and well defined. Adults are on wing from May to August.

The larvae feed on various deciduous trees and shrubs, including Cornus, Salix, Spiraea, Vaccinium, Ulmus, Fraxinus and Betula species.

Subspecies
Euchlaena johnsonaria johnsonaria
Euchlaena johnsonaria minoraria (Hulst, 1886)

References

Moths described in 1870
Angeronini